Tracy Butler may refer to:
 Tracy Butler, co-writer of the 1969 film Changes
 Tracy Butler (gymnastics), bronze medal winner in the Gymnastics at the 1983 Pan American Games
 Tracy J. Butler, artist and game developer, creator of the 2000s webcomic Lackadaisy